William J. Brown (July 12, 1940 – November 3, 1999) was an American lawyer, and was elected Ohio Attorney General in 1970 and served until leaving office in January 1983.

Career 
Brown was from Mahoning County, Ohio. He remained active in Ohio politics through the 1990s. Brown's tenure in office is one of the longest on record for the Ohio Attorney General's office. In 1982, he was defeated in the democratic primary for governor to Richard Celeste.

While in office, Brown emphasized consumer rights and created the state's first Consumer Protection section. Brown also successfully sued General Motors in the late 1970s for failing to disclose that automobile manufacturer deployed Chevrolet-built engines into more expensive Oldsmobile brand cars; the settlement included compensation paid to owners of Oldsmobiles who bought new cars from Oldsmobile dealers in 1977 and 1978 equipped with the Chevrolet V8 engines.

Following his term as Ohio Attorney General, Brown joined the law firm now known as Kegler, Brown, Hill & Ritter, headquartered in Columbus, Ohio. The firm has endowed a scholarship in his name, the William J. Brown Scholarship, at the Pettit College of Law at Ohio Northern University, Brown's alma mater.

The William J. Brown Award Consumer Protection Award is named for him.
William J. Brown memorial highway is named for him.

References

External links

William J. Brown, Ohio Attorney General's Office

1940 births
1999 deaths
Ohio Attorneys General
People from Mahoning County, Ohio
Ohio Democrats
Claude W. Pettit College of Law alumni
Burials at Oak Grove Cemetery, Delaware, Ohio
20th-century American politicians